St John's Church is in Oxford Road, Dukinfield, Greater Manchester, England. It is an active Anglican parish church in the deanery of Mottram, the archdeaconry of Macclesfield and the diocese of Chester. The church is recorded in the National Heritage List for England as a designated Grade II listed building. It stands in an elevated position at the top of a small hill.

History

St John's is a Commissioners' church designed by the Lancaster architect Edmund Sharpe, and built in 1838–40. The church cost £3,299 (equivalent to £ in ) to build and £2,599 of this was met by a grant from the Church Building Commission. The foundation stone was laid on 3 September 1838, the same day as that at St George's Church, Stalybridge, also designed by Sharpe. It was consecrated on 24 May 1841 by Rt Revd John Bird Sumner, who was at that time the Bishop of Chester. The church opened for worship in July. It provided seating for 1,234 people. Fifty years later the church was restored, with little alteration other than the addition of two windows to the chancel.

Rayner Stephens was buried in the graveyard.

Architecture

The church is built in stone with a slate roof. Its plan consists of a five-bay nave with north and south aisles, a short single-bay chancel, and a tower at the west end. The tower is in four stages, it has a west door, and at the top is a coped parapet and pinnacles. A coped parapet also runs along the walls and gables of the church. The windows are paired lancets. Inside the church are galleries on three sides. The galleries and the nave arcades are supported by octagonal columns. The organ is in the west gallery.

See also

Listed buildings in Dukinfield
List of architectural works by Edmund Sharpe
List of Commissioners' churches in Northeast and Northwest England

References

External links
 

Church of England church buildings in Greater Manchester
Grade II listed churches in the Metropolitan Borough of Tameside
Gothic Revival church buildings in Greater Manchester
Churches completed in 1840
18th-century Church of England church buildings
19th-century Church of England church buildings
Diocese of Chester
Edmund Sharpe buildings
Commissioners' church buildings
Dukinfield